"Butterfly Kisses" is a song written by Bob Carlisle and Randy Thomas from Carlisle's third studio album Butterfly Kisses (Shades of Grace). The song was written for Carlisle's daughter Brooke's 16th birthday. Carlisle also wrote a journal, Butterfly Kisses for Fathers and Their Daughters. The last track of the Butterfly Kisses (Shades Of Grace) is a country remix of the song, where instruments like the Pedal Steel Guitar and Fiddle are added as instruments. There have been many cover versions of the song including Raybon Brothers, Jeff Carson, Westlife and Cliff Richard.

Chart performance

Carlisle's rendition of the song became a major radio hit in United States, reaching the top 10 of Hot 100 Airplay and becoming a number-one single on the Adult Contemporary chart. The song also received a Dove Award for Song of the Year, as well as a Grammy Award for Best Country Song. It is also Carlisle's only chart single.

Weekly charts

Year-end charts

Raybon Brothers version

The same year that Carlisle's version was released, two country music artists each recorded covers of the song. These covers would overlap with his version, which was also a minor hit on the country charts. The higher-peaking cover was issued by the Raybon Brothers, a duo composed of Marty Raybon (former lead singer of Shenandoah) and his brother Tim. The Raybon Brothers' version was a number 37 country and number 22 Hot 100 hit in 1997. The single was released by Rick Hendrix Company to Christian radio and moved into the Top 40. One of three singles for the duo, it was also the title track to the Raybon Brothers' 1997 MCA Records debut album. The Raybon Brothers' rendition received RIAA gold certification.

Chart performance

Jeff Carson version

Jeff Carson also recorded his own version on his second album for Curb Records, which was also titled Butterfly Kisses. Carson's version peaked at number 63 on the country music charts. The album also featured an alternate version of the song, which contained elements from Kippi Brannon's then-current single "Daddy's Little Girl".

Chart performance

Other versions
There are other versions recorded including:
Westlife's version on their The Love Album'''s Asian Deluxe Edition (The main British album release however does not include the song)
Cliff Richard's version was originally released on his 1998 (UK) studio album Real as I Wanna Be. It was later included on his US compilation album Healing Love (Songs of Inspiration) An official music video has also been released. On April 18, 2014, Richard released a new version as a single in Germany titled "Schmetterlings-Küsse", sung entirely in German.
American R&B singer, and winner of The Voice season two, Jermaine Paul'', recorded a version with a music video

References

External links
 Lyrics of this song
 

1997 songs
1997 singles
Bob Carlisle songs
Jeff Carson songs
Raybon Brothers songs
1997 debut singles
Songs written by Bob Carlisle
Songs written by Randy Thomas (musician)
Song recordings produced by Tony Brown (record producer)
Song recordings produced by Don Cook
Music videos directed by John Lloyd Miller
Jive Records singles
MCA Records singles
Curb Records singles
Westlife songs
Songs about fathers